The Fort Smith Classic was a golf tournament on the Nationwide Tour. It is held each year at Hardscrabble Country Club in Fort Smith, Arkansas. It was the only annual PGA Tour event in the U.S. state of Arkansas.

The 2010 purse was a record $525,000, with $94,500 going to the winner.

The tournament was founded in 1998. Mark Hensby won the inaugural tournament at 20-under par, which is still the record low score. In 2005, Chris Couch tied the course record with a final round 60.

As of October 7, 2010, the Fort Smith Classic board notified the PGA Tour that they would not be renewing their contract for 2011.

Winners

Bolded golfers graduated to the PGA Tour via the final Nationwide Tour money list.

References

External links
Official site
PGATOUR.com's tournament site

Former Korn Ferry Tour events
Golf in Arkansas
Recurring sporting events established in 1998
Recurring sporting events disestablished in 2010
1998 establishments in Arkansas
2010 disestablishments in Arkansas